2 Fabiola is a Belgian electronic dance music group, formed in 1991 by Pat Krimson (Patrick Claesen) and Zohra. The group got its name from Queen Fabiola of Belgium.

The group was noted for its lavish and extravagant clothes and performances. It has also made the charts in the Belgian Ultratop and had success in Spain. In the Ultratop 50 and Ultratop 50, they topped the charts.
In 1999, the group took a break. Zohra started a solo career, and Pat Krimson led another project of his, called Nunca. After a while, a new 2 Fabiola was presented to the world, introducing singer Evi Goffin (Medusa, Lasgo).

After releasing some singles, the group disappeared from the Belgian music scene.

In 2007, Krimson announced the band's comeback, introducing two new singers. Their last single, "Blow Me Away", was published in July 2008.

In 2014 the group had a major hit with "She's After My Piano", after participating in the Belgium national selection for Eurovision Song Contest 2014. This song was co-written by Romanian-Norwegian artist Ovi who, for the second time, participated in the Eurovision Song Contest 2014 with duet partner Paula Seling. The two artists recorded their own version of the song for Ovi's album, A Bit of Pop Won't Hurt Anyone, (May 2014 ).

Discography

Studio albums

Singles

References

External links
 
 Discogs Artist Page

Belgian Eurodance groups
Belgian techno music groups